S&L can refer to:
 Savings and loan association, a kind of financial institution
 Savings and loan crisis, a financial crisis of Savings and Loan Association failures
 Strength & Loyalty, an album by Bone Thugs-n-Harmony
 Strengths & Limitations
 Snakes and Ladders

See also
SNL (disambiguation)